Lichfield is a constituency in Staffordshire represented in the House of Commons of the UK Parliament since its 1997 recreation by Michael Fabricant, a Conservative.

Boundaries 

 1918–1950 The Boroughs of Lichfield and Tamworth, the Urban Districts of Perry Barr and Rugeley, the Rural District of Lichfield, and parts of the Rural Districts of Tamworth and Walsall.
 1997–2010 The District of Lichfield wards of All Saints, Alrewas, Armitage with Handsacre, Boney Hay, Central, Chadsmead, Chase Terrace, Chasetown, Colton and Ridwares, Curborough, Hammerwich, Highfield, King's Bromley, Leomansley, Longdon, Redslade, St John's, Stowe, Summerfield, and Whittington, and the Borough of East Staffordshire wards of Bagots and Yoxall.
 2010 onwards The District of Lichfield wards of All Saints, Alrewas and Fradley, Armitage with Handsacre, Boley Park, Boney Hay, Burntwood Central, Chadsmead, Chase Terrace, Chasetown, Colton and Mavesyn Ridware, Curborough, Hammerwich, Highfield, King's Bromley, Leomansley, Longdon, St John's, Stowe, Summerfield, and Whittington, and the Borough of East Staffordshire wards of Bagots, Needwood, and Yoxall.

The constituency includes the northern and central parts of the Lichfield local government district, including the cathedral city of Lichfield itself, Burntwood, and also the south-western portion of East Staffordshire district, including Yoxall, Barton-under-Needwood, and Abbots Bromley.

History
The city was represented at most parliaments between 1305 (10 years after the Model Parliament), in 1327 and again in 1353, but it then ceased to be represented until the mid 16th century, from when it sent two burgesses as members to Parliament until 1664, when representation was temporarily reduced to one member during The Protectorate (ended 1680), and again in 1868, when representation was permanently reduced to one. The constituency was abolished in 1950 but reconstituted, still as a single-member constituency, in 1997.

Constituency profile
This area has very little dependence on social housing and has low unemployment compared to other areas. In 2010 Michael Fabricant obtained the 52nd highest Conservative share of the vote, out of 650 seats, although in 1997 it was only held by a majority of 238 votes. In 2010 The Guardian described the constituency as a "pleasant cathedral city on border of West Midlands and the Potteries."

Members of Parliament

1305–1660

1660–1868

1868–1950

1885–1950, as Lichfield division of Staffordshire

Since 1997, as Lichfield county constituency

Elections

Elections in the 2010s

Elections in the 2000s

Elections in the 1990s

Elections in the 1940s

Elections in the 1930s

Elections in the 1920s

Election results 1885-1918

Elections in the 1880s

Elections in the 1890s

Fulford's election voided on petition

Elections in the 1900s

Elections in the 1910s 

General Election 1914–15:

Another General Election was required to take place before the end of 1915. The political parties had been making preparations for an election to take place and by July 1914, the following candidates had been selected; 
Liberal: Courtenay Warner
Unionist: George Coates

Election results 1868-1885

Elections in the 1860s

Elections in the 1870s

Elections in the 1880s 

The 1880 election was declared void on petition.

Election results 1832-1868

Elections in the 1830s

Elections in the 1840s

 

Anson resigned by accepting the office of Steward of the Manor of Poynings, causing a by-election.

Leveson-Gower succeeded to the peerage, becoming 2nd Earl Granville and causing a by-election.

Paget was appointed Chief Equerry and Clerk Marshal to Queen Victoria, requiring a by-election.

Elections in the 1850s

 

Paget was appointed Chief Equerry and Clerk Marshal to Queen Victoria, requiring a by-election.

Anson succeeded to the peerage, becoming 2nd Earl of Lichfield, causing a by-election.

Cavendish resigned, causing a by-election.

Paget was appointed Chief Equerry and Clerk Marshal to Queen Victoria, requiring a by-election.

Elections in the 1860s

Elections before 1832

Notes

Members of Parliament

References

Sources 

Parliamentary constituencies in Staffordshire
Politics of Lichfield
Constituencies of the Parliament of the United Kingdom established in 1305
Borough of East Staffordshire
Constituencies of the Parliament of the United Kingdom disestablished in 1950
Constituencies of the Parliament of the United Kingdom established in 1997